Cory James Bird (born August 10, 1978) is a former American football safety in the National Football League for the Indianapolis Colts from 2001 to 2004.  Bird played college football at Virginia Tech and was drafted in the third round of the 2001 NFL Draft.

Bird was known for his ability to make open field tackles in crucial situations.  At Virginia Tech, Bird was a three-time winner of the best conditioned athlete award, though his professional career was cut short with injuries.  He attended Oakcrest High School in Hamilton Township, Atlantic County, New Jersey, where he was a standout wide receiver and wrestler.  He lives with his wife and four children in Atlantic County, New Jersey.

Bird also is partial owner of Bird Electric in Mays Landing, New Jersey and former owner of a barbershop known as the "41 Spot".

References

External links
Databasefootball.com
ESPN.com

1978 births
Living people
People from Hamilton Township, Atlantic County, New Jersey
Sportspeople from Atlantic City, New Jersey
Players of American football from New Jersey
American football safeties
Oakcrest High School alumni
Virginia Tech Hokies football players
Indianapolis Colts players